Football Association Red Boys Differdange was a football club, based in Differdange, in south-western Luxembourg.  It is now a part of FC Differdange 03.

History
Red Boys was founded as SC Differdange in 1907, the year after Luxembourg's first club, Fola Esch, had been set up. Despite the clubs provenance, its first appearance in Luxembourg's league as Red Boys Differdange came only in 1919 (and, then, only in the second division). Soon, though, Red Boys would embark upon the greatest runs of success in Luxembourgish football.

During the 1920s and 1930s, Red Boys competed with Spora Luxembourg for dominance of Luxembourgish football.  Red Boys was the more successful of the two, and won thirteen trophies in as many years between 1923 and 1936.  Despite the staunch competition (Spora won 8 trophies in the same period), this record has never been matched.  Despite fading after the Second World War, Red Boys remained one of the largest and most successful teams in Luxembourgish football.  Differdange's record was most impressive in the Luxembourg Cup, which the club won more times than any other team (15).

In 2003, the club merged with city rivals AS Differdange to become FC Differdange 03.

Honours
National Division
Winners (6): 1922–23, 1925–26, 1930–31, 1931–32, 1932–33, 1978–79
Runners-up (10): 1926–27, 1933–34, 1934–35, 1957–58, 1973–74, 1975–76, 1979–80, 1980–81, 1983–84, 1984–85

Luxembourg Cup
Winners (15): 1924–25, 1925–26, 1926–27, 1928–29, 1929–30, 1930–31, 1933–34, 1935–36, 1951–52, 1952–53, 1957–58, 1971–72, 1978–79, 1981–82, 1984–85
Runners-up (9): 1923–24, 1931–32, 1934–35, 1947–48, 1949–50, 1954–55, 1969–70, 1976–77, 1985–86

European Competition
Red Boys Differdange qualified for UEFA European competition ten times.

UEFA Champions League
First round (1): 1979–80

UEFA Cup Winners' Cup
First round (3): 1972–73, 1982–83, 1985–86

UEFA Cup
First round (6): 1974–75, 1976–77, 1977–78, 1980–81, 1981–82, 1984–85

Red Boys never progressed past the first tie in any European competition.  The club won one match in Europe, winning their 1979–80 European Cup European Cup first leg 2–1 against Omonia Nicosia before losing 6–1 in Cyprus.  In the 1984–85 UEFA Cup, Red Boys managed a surprise goalless draw with giants Ajax, but was crushed 14–0 in the return (which remains a UEFA Cup record). In the 2009–10 season, they played in the UEFA Europa League qualification against Croatian Rijeka.
Overall, Differdange's record in European competition reads:

References

Red Boys Differdange
Red Boys Differdange
Red Boys Differdange
Association football clubs disestablished in 2003
1907 establishments in Luxembourg
2003 disestablishments in Luxembourg